William West (29 December 1880 – 9 October 1951) was a British wrestler. He competed in the men's Greco-Roman light heavyweight at the 1908 Summer Olympics.

References

External links
 

1880 births
1951 deaths
British male sport wrestlers
Olympic wrestlers of Great Britain
Wrestlers at the 1908 Summer Olympics
Place of birth missing